The Siebel Institute of Technology is a for-profit, unaccredited vocational college located on Goose Island in Chicago that focuses on brewing science. The school is the oldest brewing school located in the United States and has been in operation since its founding in 1868 by German immigrant chemist John Ewald Siebel (1845-1919). Prior to immigrating to the United States in 1866, Siebel earned his doctorate in chemistry from the University of Berlin Originally named the Zymotechnic Institute, the school was renamed after its founder in 1872. During Prohibition, the institute diversified by adding courses in baking, refrigeration, engineering, milling, carbonated beverages and related topics; after the repeal of Prohibition, courses not concerned with brewing were discontinued.

In 2013 the institute was moved to the Kendall College’s building.
There are satellite campuses in Munich, Germany and Montreal, Quebec, Canada.

Notable alumni
 Joseph F. Fanta (1914–1988), Illinois state representative
 Teri Fahrendorf (born 1960), American brewer and founder of the Pink Boots Society

References

External links
 Official website

Beer organizations
1868 establishments in Illinois
Education in Chicago
For-profit universities and colleges in the United States